Echinocystis macrocarpa can refer to:

Echinocystis macrocarpa Britton, a synonym of Echinopepon racemosus (Steud.) C.Jeffrey
Echinocystis macrocarpa Greene, a synonym of Marah macrocarpa (Greene) Greene